Rex Chikoko is a Malawian investigative journalist, media, corporate communication consultant and media analyst. 

He is the Public Relations and Communications Manager for the government-owned National Oil Company of Malawi. 
He was the Editor at Times Group Limited, responsible for The Daily Times, Malawi News and The Sunday Times. 

He is known for his work at Nation Publications Limited and Thomson Reuters Foundation. He is known for his coverage of illicit transfers of money and money laundering. His coverage of the 2013 cashgate scandals involving Malawian government financial irregularities and fraud were widely published. He was also known for uncovering a story in which the Malawi government’s deal with a Brazilian mining company, Vale for the construction of a railway was unproductive for Malawi.

Currently, he is also known for his television and radio commentary on current affairs and is regularly featured on Times Television as well as Times radio. He also hosts a television programme, The Constitution.

Background
He attended an Illicit Finance Journalism Program at City University London.  He was affiliated with the Mail and Guardian Centre for Investigative Journalism (MGCIJ) in Johannesburg. He developed an interest in investigative journalism after attending training workshops in Malawi and South Africa. He served as Chairperson of the Association for Journalists Against HIV/AIDS.

Awards
In 2016, Chikoko won Misa-Malawi's Business and Economics Journalist of the Year-Print award.
In 2018, Chikoko won Misa-Malawi's Democracy and Good Governance Journalist of the year-Print award.

References

External links
Interview with OSISA

Living people
Malawian journalists
Year of birth missing (living people)